"Sexy Lady" is the first single by Hitmaka, known then as Yung Berg. It appears on his Almost Famous: The Sexy Lady EP and his first album, Look What You Made Me. Released in 2007, it samples the London Symphony Orchestra's version of "Diamonds Are Forever", and the chorus is an interpolation of Millie Jackson's "Slow Tongue". The single entered the Billboard Hot 100 at number 99 and peaked at number 18. The music video includes cameos by the actress Drew Sidora and the singer Kat DeLuna. At the end of the video, Yung Berg's song "Where Do We Go" can also be heard.

Remix
The official remix of the song features Jim Jones and Rich Boy. Another remix has DJ Khaled and appears on his EP. In the music video, Rich Boy has a different verse and there are cameos from Juelz Santana.

Charts

Weekly charts

Year-end charts

References

2007 debut singles
Hitmaka songs
Jim Jones (rapper) songs
Rich Boy songs
Songs with music by John Barry (composer)
Songs with lyrics by Don Black (lyricist)
2007 songs
Epic Records singles
Songs written by Hitmaka
MNRK Music Group singles
Songs written by Slick Rick
Song recordings produced by Yung Berg
Music videos directed by Dale Resteghini